Akkayyapalem is one of the busiest localities in the city of Visakhapatnam, India. It is a part of Visakhapatnam North Constituency.

Etymology
Akkayyapalem is along Dwaraka Nagar, the arterial road of Visakhapatnam.

Localities
Neighbouring localities include Dwaraka Nagar, Railway New Colony, Dondaparthy, Santhi puram and Tatichetlapalem. Lalithanagar, Nandagiri Nagar, Jagannadhapuram Abidnagar, Kailasapuram and Saligramapuram are important residential areas in Akkayyapalem.

Transport
Akkayyapalem is well connected to Gajuwaka, NAD X Road, Maddilapalem and Pendurthi. APSRTC has buses with route numbers 48, 48A, 38 through the area's bus stop. Local auto rickshaws are also available.
APSRTC routes

References

Neighbourhoods in Visakhapatnam